Cobadin is a commune in Constanța County, Northern Dobruja, Romania. The commune includes five villages:
Cobadin (historical names: Cobadinu)
Viișoara (historical name: Caciamac)
Negrești (historical name: Carabacâ)
Conacu (historical name: Beșaul)
Curcani (historical name:  Chertic-Punar) - disestablished by Presidential Decree before 1990, the village is nevertheless listed in the official settlements register

Two battles were fought on the territory of the commune and in the surrounding area during World War I: the First Battle of Cobadin (September 17–19, 1916), and the Second Battle of Cobadin (October 19–25, 1916).

Population
As of 2011, the population of the commune was 8,346, out of which:
 6,480 (77.44%) Romanians
 1,021 (12.23%) Turks
 442 (5.29%) Tatars
 359 (4.30%) Romani
 7 (0.08%) Aromanians
 37 others

Famous natives
Pericle Martinescu, writer and journalist

References

Communes in Constanța County
Localities in Northern Dobruja